The Joe Chithalen Memorial Musical Instrument Lending Library (Joe's M.I.L.L.) is a library of musical instruments that any aspiring musician can borrow for their use – usually for a 4-week period.  There is no charge for the loans.  It is located in Kingston, Ontario, Canada.

The collection contains over 800 items that vary in type including guitars, other stringed instruments, drums, horns, and pianos, as well as other accessories such as books, sheet music, effects pedals and microphones. Many of the musical instruments available on loan have been donated by residents of Eastern Ontario.

Joe's M.I.L.L. is a registered charity that was founded in 2001 by close friends and family of the late Joe Chithalen.  It is funded by grants, donations and numerous community-based fund raising events.

References

External links
 www.joesmill.org/ Joe's M.I.L.L. official website

Culture of Kingston, Ontario
Musical instrument libraries